Ngouloure Mahamat (born 1 September 1990) is a Cameroonian footballer who last played for Bolivian side Unión Maestranza as a centre back.

Club career
Ngouloure came to Bolívar Youth Team from his birth country. After playing for some clubs in Bolivia and taking a test in Deportes Iquique, he signed with Cobreloa in the Chilean Primera División. In 2015, he signed with Municipal Mejillones in the Chilean Segunda División, making six appearances. In 2017, he returned to Bolivia to play for Unión Maestranza.

International career
He represented Cameroon U17.

Personal life
Born in Foumban, has seven brothers and speaks four languages, which are French, Spanish, English and Njimom. He declared during an interview with Chilean newspaper Lun that his idol was Marc Vivien Foe and in his death time he wept inconsolably and was motivation for him to be future footballer.

In 2013, he worked as a miner at the Codelco's Radomiro Tomic mine after being released by Cobreloa.

References

External links
 
 Ngouloure Mahamat at playmakerstats.com (English version of ceroacero.es)

1990 births
Living people
Cameroonian footballers
Cameroon youth international footballers
Cameroonian expatriate footballers
Cobreloa footballers
Naval de Talcahuano footballers
A.C. Barnechea footballers
Municipal Mejillones footballers
Primera B de Chile players
Chilean Primera División players
Segunda División Profesional de Chile players
Expatriate footballers in Bolivia
Expatriate footballers in Chile
Cameroonian expatriate sportspeople in Chile
Association football defenders